Live At The BBC is a compilation album by The Beautiful South. It was released in May 2011 and features three CDs and one DVD.

References

The Beautiful South albums